Juho Kauppinen (born 4 August 1986) is the former accordionist of the Finnish band Korpiklaani. He has also been in Falchion, which was a Finnish Death Metal band, in which he was the vocalist and lead guitarist.

Falchion
Falchion was founded in 2002 by Juho Kauppinen and Joonas Simonen at the ages of 15 and 16 years old, they were influenced by Amorphis and Ensiferum. After some time Juho Kauppinen felt the need to change the line-up since the members lived far from each other. Sadly, after more line-up changes, the band split-up in December 2009.

Korpiklaani
Korpiklaani was founded in 1993 with the name of Shamaani Duo, until 1997 when they changed their name to Shaman, until 2003 when they changed it to Korpiklaani. Juho Kauppinen joined Korpiklaani in October 2004, so Falchion was put on hold. In March 2013, Juho announced he would be leaving Korpiklaani stating he wishes to now pursue his goals elsewhere and that the band has already found a substitute accordionist.

Finnish accordionists
Living people
1986 births
21st-century accordionists